() is a private satellite broadcasting station in Kanda, Tokyo, Japan. It is an independent television station and is a subsidiary of Bic Camera. Its channel name is BS11 (BS Eleven) and was BS11 Digital until March 31, 2011.

BS11 gives high priority to news programs, sports, Korean drama, TV Show, anime including late night anime and 3D television programs.

Channel 
 Television: BS211ch

References

External links 
 Official website 
 BS11 NEWS 
 BS11 Korea Drama 
 BS11 Anime 
 BS11 TV Show 
 BS11 EDU 
 BS11 Movie 
 BS11 Sports 

Television stations in Japan
Television channels and stations established in 1999
Television in Tokyo
3D television channels
1999 establishments in Japan